Hertford Heath is a village and civil parish near the county town of Hertford in Hertfordshire, England. The population at the 2011 Census was 2,672.

Geography

It is located on a heath above the River Lea valley, on its south side. Almost all of the village is 90 metres (300 feet) above sea level, with most of the surrounding fields being arable farm land, or cattle and horse grazing.

History

Hertford Heath was once a settlement of the Catuvellauni tribe, before Julius Caesar invaded in 54 BC.

The original hamlet of Hertford Heath was the southern part of the modern village along London Road, and was in the parish of Great Amwell. A separate village and parish called Little Amwell was centred on a village green a short distance to the north of Hertford Heath. During the twentieth century the urban areas of the two villages merged and the combined village became known generally as Hertford Heath.

In 1956 builders laying concrete for the garages in Trinity Road, came across a Belgic grave from about the 40–50 AD period, early Iron Age pottery was discovered and remnants are available to view in the British Museum.

More extensive historical facts can be found here extrapolated from a note written by Esme Nix of Rush Green (an area nestled in the corner of Downfield Road, Hoe Lane, Gallows Hill and the A10, giving the service station and A10 junction its name.)

Governance
Hertford Heath is part of the district of East Hertfordshire and the county of Hertfordshire. The civil parish of Hertford Heath was created on 1 April 1990 from the former parish of Little Amwell, which was abolished, and parts of the neighbouring parishes of Great Amwell, Stanstead St Margarets, and Ware. The parish is administered by Hertford Heath Parish Council. Whilst the civil parish is called Hertford Heath, the ecclesiastical parish which covers the area is called "Holy Trinity, Little Amwell".

Shops and facilities

The village has modest amenities including a convenience store, numerous public houses and eateries and a service station.

 The Silver Fox on London Road is a centrally located country pub with a small garden. It offers home cooked food and a wide selection at the bar.

 The Goat Inn at the junction of Vicarage Causeway and Downfield Road is the oldest building in the village, with cartography dating pre-1756 showing its location and existence. It is another country pub serving food and boasting an exterior seating area overlooking the village green and the pétanque court. Local legend suggests that Dick Turpin may have patronised The Goat Inn.
 The College Arms (formerly the Jolly Pindar, and prior to that, the East India College Arms – linked to the then East India Company College [1805], now Haileybury College) is a modern gastropub.

 The Galley Hall, located in Hailey Lane is a freehouse pub offering home-cooked food.
 Hertford Heath Motors are a small MOT test centre and workshop and used car dealer located centrally on London Road.
 Haileybury Motor Works offer garage services, repairs, mechanics and equipment, and are located on the southern edge of the village by Haileybury College [see Schools below].

Schools

Hertford Heath Junior Mixed Infant (JMI) School caters for children from Nursery up to Year 6 (leavers for Secondary Education).

Haileybury College, a private boarding school (formerly the East India Company College [1805], Imperial Service College [1845] and United Services College [1874]) is on the south-east boundary of the village. It offers facilities to the village and public at large who are able, subject to availability, to use its modern sports complex which includes:

 a 25-metre deck level indoor heated swimming pool
 an 8-court badminton hall
 4 squash courts
 all-weather surface (with floodlights)
 a state-of-the-art fitness suite
 8 tennis courts (summer only)

Notable locations and buildings

 The Village Hall – plays host to events such as the local farmers' market and the Annual Horticultural Society show
 Holy Trinity Church (Little Amwell) led by the Rev. Nick Sharp. It was built in 1863 to the design of Ewan Christian in the Early English Gothic style. It is a Grade II listed building. The church celebrated its 150th anniversary in 2013.
 Ermine Street, the former Roman Road from London to York, runs from the rear of Hertford Heath Motors to Goose Green near Hoddesdon and onwards to London (it is now a bridleway to the South. The former route across the village through what is now Hogsdell Lane, on to Rush Green, has been bisected by the main route through Hertford Heath (B1197) and the development of housing across the village.
 The Hertford Heath nature reserve and Balls Wood nature reserve cover nearly 80 hectares of surrounding countryside and woodland. Hertford Heath is a Site of Special Scientific Interest, and both sites are managed by the Herts and Middlesex Wildlife Trust. Balls Wood was purchased by the Trust from the Forestry Commission following a successful campaign.

Notable residents
 Florence L. Barclay (1862-1921): a romance novelist and short story writer. She was the wife of Reverend Charles W. Barclay, who was the vicar of Holy Trinity from 1881 to 1920.
 Vera Barclay (1893–1989): the daughter of Florence and Charles Barclay. She was a pioneer of female leadership in the  Scout Movement and was instrumental in the establishment of the Wolf Cub programme in the United Kingdom and France. She later became a prolific author on a range of subjects, especially children's stories.

Freedom of the Parish
The following people and military units have received the Freedom of the Parish of Hertford Heath.

Individuals
 Frederick "Fred" Harrington.
 Lilly Bean.
 Gerald Nix: January 2000.
 Robert "Bob" Akers.

See also

 Hertford
 Hertfordshire
 Lea Valley

References

External links

 Hertford Heath Parish Council

 

Villages in Hertfordshire
Civil parishes in Hertfordshire
East Hertfordshire District